Athletes from the former Netherlands Antilles competed at the 2011 Pan American Games in Guadalajara, Mexico from October 14 to 30, 2011, about one year after the dissolution of the country. Hubert Isenia was the Chef de mission of the team. The team consisted of eleven athletes in six sports.

Medalists

Cycling

Road 
Athletes from the Netherlands Antilles qualified one male cyclist in road cycling.

Men

Karate

Athletes from the Netherlands Antilles qualified one athlete in the 61 kg women's category.

Sailing

Athletes from the Netherlands Antilles qualified three boats and three athletes in the sailing competition.

Women

Open

Shooting

Athletes from the Netherlands Antilles qualified two shooters.

Men

Swimming

Athletes from the Netherlands Antilles qualified two swimmers.

Men

Taekwondo

The Netherlands Antilles received a wildcard to send one male taekwondo athlete. 

Men

References

Nations at the 2011 Pan American Games
2011
Independent athletes
Pan
Pan